Gypsochares nielswolffi is a moth of the family Pterophoridae that is endemic to Madeira.

References

Moths described in 1992
Oidaematophorini
Endemic fauna of Madeira
Moths of Africa